Esai Manuel Morales Jr. (born October 1, 1962) is an American actor. He has had notable roles in the films Bad Boys with Sean Penn and La Bamba with Lou Diamond Phillips. His television roles include the PBS 2002 drama series American Family, the Showtime series Resurrection Blvd. (2000–2002), portraying Lt. Tony Rodriguez on NYPD Blue (2001–2004), Joseph Adama in the science fiction series Caprica (2009–2010), Camino del Rio in the Netflix original series Ozark (2017) and as the DC Comics villain Deathstroke / Slade Wilson in the superhero series Titans (2018).

Morales will appear as the main antagonist in the 2023 spy action film Mission: Impossible – Dead Reckoning Part One opposite Tom Cruise, a role which he will reprise in Mission: Impossible – Dead Reckoning Part Two in 2024.

Early life
Of Puerto Rican descent, Morales was born in Brooklyn, New York, to Esai Morales Sr., a welder, and Iris Margarita (née Declet), a union activist involved with the International Ladies' Garment Workers' Union. Morales began his pursuit of an acting career by attending the School of Performing Arts in Manhattan.

Career
His first professional performances were in theater and television in New York. His first major film was Bad Boys (1983), about rival teenagers sentenced to a juvenile correction facility. Morales appeared in a 1985 episode of the TV series Fame. He co-starred with Burt Lancaster in the 1986 NBC miniseries On Wings of Eagles, playing the Iranian Rashid, the hero of a true story about Ross Perot. Morales also appeared in Miami Vice, The Equalizer, and 24.

He played Bob Morales, the real-life ex-convict and biker half-brother of 1950s rock and roll singer Ritchie Valens, in La Bamba (1987). He also played Nicholas Walker in Ultraviolet (1992). Some of his other roles have reflected his socio-political interests, such as The Burning Season in 1994, My Family/Mi Familia in 1995, The Disappearance of Garcia Lorca (1997) and Southern Cross (1999).  In the latter three films, as well as in others such as Bloodhounds of Broadway (1989) and Rapa Nui (1994), Morales saw increased amounts of screen time, starting with a role in the Pauly Shore film In The Army Now (1994).  He portrayed a police officer in the film Dogwatch (1996) and Father Herrera in The Virgin of Juarez (2006).

In the 1990s, he guest-starred on episodes of The Outer Limits, Tales from the Crypt, and two shorter-lived series, L.A. Doctors and The Hunger.  He appeared in a two-part episode of Family Law in 2000. He was part of the main cast of the long-running series NYPD Blue for three and a half seasons, from 2001 to 2004, as the head of the 15th precinct detective squad.

He played a drug dealer named Lulu in the 2002 film Paid in Full. In 2005, he was a voice actor in the video game True Crime: New York City.

Morales was cast in the film American Fusion (2005), and on June 19, 2006, he joined the cast of the Fox series Vanished, as FBI agent Michael Tyner; the series ran for one season. In 2007, Morales appeared in an episode of the USA Network drama series Burn Notice, as a Cuban shopkeeper being shaken down for "protection" money by local criminals. In early 2008, Morales had a role in the CBS drama Jericho, as Major Edward Beck. He appeared in all seven episodes of the shortened second season That same year, he appeared in Kill Kill Faster Faster, a film noir based on the novel of the same name by Joel Rose.

In May 2008, it was announced that Morales would play the role of Joseph Adama in the science fiction television series Caprica – Syfy's prequel to the series Battlestar Galactica. The series, though highly anticipated, only ran for one season in 2010. In 2009, he served as an official festival judge for the Noor Iranian Film Festival in Los Angeles.

In 2011, Morales starred in the drama film Gun Hill Road as Enrique, and in the web drama Los Americans airing on PIC.tv. and Morales worked with Tony Plana, Yvonne DeLaRosa, Lupe Ontiveros, and JC Gonzalez in Los Americans,  an Internet program launched in May 2011. 

In March 2015, Robert Rodriguez cast him as Lord Amancio Malvado for the second season of horror series From Dusk till Dawn: The Series, which was followed in 2017 by a main role in the first season of the Netflix original series Ozark, and then in 2019 in an antagonist role for the second season of the DC Universe superhero series Titans as Slade Wilson / Deathstroke.

On May 21, 2020, Morales was officially confirmed to be starring in Mission: Impossible – Dead Reckoning Part One  as the film's villain, a role which he is reprising in the second part.

Awards and honors
In 2005, Morales (along with Mercedes Ruehl) received the Rita Moreno HOLA Award for Excellence from the Hispanic Organization of Latin Actors (HOLA).

He received the Lifetime Achievement Award from the Arpa Foundation for his impact as an actor and role model.

Activism
Morales has described himself as an "actorvist", primarily as one of the founders of the National Hispanic Foundation for the Arts, taking inspiration from his mother, who was an organizer for the International Ladies' Garment Workers' Union. He is also interested in environmental issues and was a founding board member of E.C.O. (Earth Communications Office).

In a February 28, 2007, all-star benefit reading of The Gift of Peace at UCLA's Freud Playhouse, he portrayed a hopeful member of a struggling immigrant family. The play was an open appeal and fundraiser for passage of U.S. House Resolution 808, which sought to establish a Cabinet-level "Department of Peace" in the U.S. government, to be funded by a two percent diversion of the Pentagon's annual budget.

Personal life
Morales is a vegetarian. He has a daughter, born in 2010.

Morales' first name is frequently used in crossword puzzles, because its rare construction makes it a prize for crossword constructors (it is a four-letter word in English that is 75 percent vowels, including the first and last letters). One crossword clue website estimated that between 1994 and 2016, "ESAI" had been used as a crossword answer over 100 times in American papers such as Los Angeles Times, The New York Times,  and The Washington Post.

Filmography

Film

Television

Video games

References

External links

Official website at esaimorales.com

Facebook
MySpace

1962 births
Male actors from New York City
American male film actors
American people of Puerto Rican descent
American male television actors
Living people
People from Brooklyn
Hispanic and Latino American male actors
Fiorello H. LaGuardia High School alumni
21st-century American male actors